Hans-Pavia Rosing (22 June 1948 – 9 July 2018) was a Greenlandic politician and civil servant. He received Greenland Peace Prize in the year 1985. In 1987, he became Greenland Parliament member. He remained Minister of Economic Affairs for a specific time. Rosing served two terms as the head of the Inuit Circumpolar Council (1980-1986).

References 

1948 births
2018 deaths
20th-century Greenlandic politicians
Greenlandic members of the Folketing
Inuit people